Sainte Therese or variation, may refer to:

People
 A saint named Thérèse or Teresa
 Thérèse Couderc (1805-1895) Marie-Victoire Couderc, Sainte Thérèse, French Catholic nun
 Thérèse of Lisieux (1873-1897) Marie Françoise-Thérèse Martin, Sainte Thérèse, Saint Thérèse of the Child Jesus and the Holy Face, French Catholic nun

Places

Canada

Quebec
 Sainte-Thérèse, Quebec, a city and suburb north of Montreal
 Sainte-Thérèse-de-Blainville, Quebec, now called Blainville, a city and suburb north of Montreal
 Sainte-Thérèse-de-la-Gatineau
 Sainte-Thérèse-de-Gaspé
 Saint-Eustache—Sainte-Thérèse (electoral district), a federal riding

Ontario
(All three places are in Cochrane District)
 Lac-Sainte-Thérèse, a dispersed rural community
 Lac Ste. Thérèse (Lake Ste. Therese), a lake upon which the community lies
 Ste.-Thérèse Creek, a stream that flows into the lake

Facilities and structures
 Sainte-Thérèse station (Exo), Sainte-Thérèse, Quebec, Canada; a commuter rail station
 Sainte-Thérèse Assembly (Saint Therese Plant), a defunct General Motors automotive factory
 Fort Sainte Thérèse, several French colonial era forts on the Richelieu River in Canada, New France
 Séminaire de Sainte-Thérèse, a former seminary campus (now converted into a CEGEP) in Sainte-Thérèse, Quebec, Canada
 Académie Sainte-Thérèse, a French-language private school in des Laurentides, Quebec, Canada
 Clinique Sainte-Thérèse Heliport, and Clinique Sainte-Thérèse; Luxembourg City, Luxembourg; see List of airports in Luxembourg

Churches
 Church of St. Thérèse of Lisieux (disambiguation)
 Sainte Therese Church, Curepipe, Mauritius
 Sainte-Thérèse-de-l'Enfant-Jésus, Hirson, Aisne, France
 Basilica of Sainte-Thérèse, Lisieux, Calvados, Normandy, France
 Co-Cathedral of St. Therese, Savannakhet, Laos
 Chapelle Saint Joseph & Sainte Thérèse, Dol Cathedral, Dol-de-Bretagne, Brittany, France

Other uses
 Sainte-Thérèse Raid (1760) in Canada, New France

See also

 List of places named after Saint Thérèse of Lisieux
 
 
 
 
 Therese (name)
 Therese (disambiguation)
Saint Teresa (disambiguation)
Santa Teresa (disambiguation)
Little Flower (disambiguation), for topics about Sainte Therese de Lisieux